Dieci stratagemmi (Italian: "Ten Stratagems") is an album by Franco Battiato. It was released in fall of 2004 by Sony Music, and features musicians like the Krisma and Lacuna Coil's female singer Cristina Scabbia.

Battiato came up with the idea of this album after reading the book Thirty-Six Stratagems, an ancient Chinese tactic and strategy military book.

Track listing 

 "Tra sesso e castità"  - 3:26
 "Le aquile non volano a stormi" - 3:27
 "Ermeneutica" - 3:34
 "Fortezza Bastiani" - 3:21
 "Odore di polvere da sparo"  - 3:29
 "I'm That" - 3:33
 "Conforto alla vita" - 3:23
 "23 coppie di cromosomi" - 3:35
 "Apparenza e realtà"  - 3:39
 "La porta dello spavento supremo"; "La porta dello spavento supremo, il sogno" - 3:50

References

Franco Battiato albums
2004 albums
Italian-language albums